John Baylor is the name of:

 John R. Baylor (1822–1894), US Indian agent, publisher, editor, and Confederate politician and colonel during the American Civil War
 John Baylor (American football) (born 1954), American retired National Football League player